Gnaphosa bithynica is a ground spider species found in Crete and Turkey.

See also 
 List of Gnaphosidae species

References

External links 

Gnaphosidae
Spiders of Europe
Arthropods of Turkey
Spiders described in 1903